The 2004–05 Latvian Hockey League season was the 14th season of the Latvian Hockey League, the top level of ice hockey in Latvia. Eight teams participated in the league, and HK Riga 2000 won the championship.

Regular season

Playoffs
ASK/Ogre - SC Energija 3–0 on series
HK Vilki Riga - SK Riga 18 3–0 on series
HK Riga 2000 - SK Riga 20 3–0 on series
HK Liepajas Metalurgs - HK Zemgale 3–0 on series
Semifinals
ASK/Ogre - HK Vilki Riga 3–2 on series
HK Riga 2000 - HK Liepajas Metalurgs 3–1 on series
Final
HK Riga 2000 - ASK/Ogre 4–0 on series
3rd place
HK Liepajas Metalurgs - HK Vilki Riga 2–0 on series

External links
 Season on hockeyarchives.info

Latvian Hockey League
Latvian Hockey League seasons
Latvian